The 32nd annual Japanese Regional Football League Competition took place from 22 November 2008 to 30 November 2008. It took place across the prefectures of Fukuoka, Kōchi, Tottori and Okinawa. It is the tournament which decided promotion to the Japan Football League for the 2009 season. As three teams were promoted from the Japan Football League to J. League Division 2, the top three teams in this competition were promoted: Machida Zelvia, V-Varen Nagasaki and Honda Lock.

Tournament outline

Preliminary round – Four groups of four teams play each other once in a round-robin tournament. The top-placed team in each group advances to the final round.
In the final round, the four winners from the preliminary round play each other once in a round-robin tournament.

Three points are awarded for a win in standard time and zero for a loss. If at the end of standard time the result is a tie, a penalty shoot-out is held; the winning team is awarded 2 points and the losing team 1.

If the number of points are the same, the league position is ordered by goal difference, then the number of goals scored, and finally the result between the respective teams. If the 1st-place position cannot be decided by these factors, a playoff will be contested between the top two teams.

Venues

Preliminary round
Group A - Honjō Athletic Stadium, Kitakyushu city, Fukuoka prefecture
Group B - Kochi Haruno Athletic Stadium, Haruno, Kōchi Prefecture
Group C - Tottori Bank Bird Stadium, Tottori city, Tottori prefecture
Group D - Coca-Cola West Sports Park, Tottori city, Tottori prefecture

Final Round
 Ishigaki Island Soccer Park Anma, Ishigaki city, Okinawa prefecture

Participating teams

9 Regional League champions
Hokkaido: Norbritz Hokkaido
Tohoku: Grulla Morioka
Kanto: Machida Zelvia
Hokushinetsu: Nagano Parceiro
Tokai: Shizuoka
Kansai: Banditonce Kakogawa
Chugoku: Renofa Yamaguchi
Shikoku: Kamatamare Sanuki
Kyushu: Okinawa Kariyushi

Runner-Up from selected leagues
Regional Leagues whose representative reached the final round in 2007, are eligible for a second team to represent them. This would normally be four teams, however this year there were only three.
Kansai: Ain Food
Chugoku: Sagawa Express Chugoku
Kyushu: V-Varen Nagasaki

High performing teams in the All Japan Senior Football Championship
NEC Tokin (Tohoku) (runner up)
Honda Lock (Kyushu) (third place)
Matsumoto Yamaga (Hokushinetsu) (fourth place)
NEC Tokin were originally announced to participate, however due to poor business performances from their parent company, their entry was withdrawn and replaced by fourth place Matsumoto Yamaga.

Invited teams
 Tochigi Uva (Kanto)
 Yazaki Valente (Tokai)

Results

Preliminary round

Group A

Group B

Group C

Group D

Final Round

References
 Japan Football Association - The 32nd National Regional Football League Competition - Schedule and Results 
 Japan Football Association - The 32nd National Regional Football League Competition - Tournament Outline 
 Japan Football Association - The 32nd National Regional Football League Competition - Final Round 
 The Rec.Sport.Soccer Statistics Foundation - Japan Fourth and Lower Levels 2008 - All-Syakaijin Cup

2008
play